The Amasia District was a raion (district) of the Armenian Soviet Socialist Republic from 1930 and later in 1991 of the Republic of Armenia until its disestablishment in 1995. The Amasia District today constitutes a northwestern part of the Shirak Province (marz) and bordered the Kars Province of the Republic of Turkey to the west, and the Javakheti region of Georgia to the north. Its administrative center was the town Amasia.

History 
The Amasia District was formed on the territory of the Armenian SSR in 1930, originally part of the Leninakan uezd (previously Alexandropol uezd). Amasia is the only territory of the former Kars Oblast retained by Armenia as the rest of it was annexed by Turkey through the Treaty of Kars.

The district and its capital were originally known as Aghbaba before being renamed Amasia in the 1930s.

Shortly after the Dissolution of the Soviet Union, the Republic of Armenia consolidated the Amasia, Ani, Artik, Akhuryan, and Ashotsk districts into the larger Shirak Province.

Demographics

Villages

See also 

 Districts of the Armenian Soviet Socialist Republic

Notes

References 

Districts of Armenia
1930 establishments in Armenia
1995 disestablishments in Armenia

Geography of Shirak Province
Formerly Azerbaijani-majority districts of Armenia